Claude Arthur Marquet (1869–1920) was an Australian political cartoonist, noted for his unique illustrative style and radical political views.

Life
Marquet was born in 1869 in Moonta, South Australia, the son of a French workman painter. The family later moved to the larger town of Wallaroo, South Australia, and the young Marquet attended Taplin's Grammar School there. After school, he initially worked as a miner, before obtaining work as a printer's compositor. In that role he became skilled in process engraving.

Marquet married Ann Donnell at St Mary's Church in Wallaroo in June 1891, by which time he was already an accomplished black-and-white artist. In 1897, he obtained his first work as an artist, employed as cartoonist for Quiz, a weekly magazine published in Adelaide. In the following years, Marquet sold work to a variety of magazines, including The Bulletin, Tocsin, Table Talk, The Australian Worker and Melbourne Punch. With his career taking off, Marquet moved to Melbourne in 1902 and then to Sydney in 1906.

On 17 April 1920, Marquet and a companion were presumed drowned when a sailing boat they were travelling on sank during a sudden squall in Botany Bay. His body was never recovered. Following his death, an anthology of his work in The Worker was published, featuring tributes from contemporaries including Henry Lawson, Mary Gilmore and C. J. Dennis.

Works

Marquet was a prolific illustrator, at times creating up to four cartoons each week. He worked almost exclusively in the black-and-white medium, using hard lines that showed up well, even given the low production standards of many of the publications of the day. Most of Marquet's work appeared in publications that supported left-wing and radical political positions.

One of Marquet's best-known works is "The Blood Vote", an anti-conscription poster that was printed in great volume during the bitter second conscription campaign in Australia during the First World War. The illustration, showing a worried woman casting a vote on conscription, features a verse by William Winspear.

References

Other reading
 

1869 births
1920 deaths
Deaths by drowning in Australia
Deaths due to shipwreck
Australian people of French descent
Australian illustrators
Australian editorial cartoonists
Accidental deaths in New South Wales
People from Moonta, South Australia